Santa Bárbara de Barinas Airport  is an airport serving Santa Bárbara de Barinas, a town in the Barinas state of Venezuela. The runway is adjacent to the south edge of town.

It may not be operating.

See also
Transport in Venezuela
List of airports in Venezuela

References

External links
 OpenStreetMap - Santa Bárbara
 OurAirports - Santa Bárbara
 SkyVector - Santa Bárbara

Airports in Venezuela